Phaeton (alternatively Phaethon  or Phaëton ; from) was the hypothetical planet hypothesized by the Titius–Bode law to have existed between the orbits of Mars and Jupiter, the destruction of which supposedly led to the formation of the asteroid belt (including the dwarf planet Ceres).  The hypothetical planet was named for Phaethon, the son of the sun god Helios in Greek mythology, who attempted to drive his father's solar chariot for a day with disastrous results and was ultimately destroyed by Zeus.

Phaeton hypothesis

According to the hypothesized Titius–Bode law, a planet was believed to exist between Mars and Jupiter. After learning of the regular sequence discovered by the German astronomer and mathematician Johann Daniel Titius, astronomer Johann E. Bode urged a search for the fifth planet corresponding to a gap in the sequence. (1) Ceres, the largest asteroid in the asteroid belt (now considered a dwarf planet), was serendipitously discovered in 1801 by the Italian Giuseppe Piazzi and found to closely match the "empty" position in Titius' sequence, which led many to believe it to be the "missing planet". However, in 1802 astronomer Heinrich Wilhelm Matthäus Olbers discovered and named the asteroid (2) Pallas, a second object in roughly the same orbit as (1) Ceres.

Olbers proposed that these two discoveries were the fragments of a disrupted planet that had formerly orbited the Sun, and predicted that more of these pieces would be found. The discovery of the asteroid (3) Juno by Karl Ludwig Harding and (4) Vesta by Olbers, buttressed his hypothesis. In 1823, German linguist and retired teacher  called Olbers' destroyed planet Phaëthon, linking it to the Greek myths and legends about Phaethon and others. 

In 1927, Franz Xaver Kugler wrote a short book titled Sibyllinischer Sternkampf und Phaëthon in naturgeschichtlicher Beleuchtung (The Sybilline Battle of the Stars and Phaeton Seen as Natural History). The central idea in Kugler's book is that the myth of Phaethon was based on a real event: Making use of ancient sources, Kugler argued that Phaeton had been a very bright celestial object that appeared around 1500 BC which fell to Earth not long afterwards as a shower of large meteorites, causing catastrophic fires and floods in Africa and elsewhere.

Hypotheses regarding the formation of the asteroid belt from the destruction of a hypothetical fifth planet are today collectively referred to as "the disruption theory". These hypotheses state that there was once a major planetary member of the Solar System circulating in the present gap between Mars and Jupiter, which was destroyed by one or more of the following hypothetical processes:
 it veered too close to Jupiter and was torn apart by its powerful tides
 it was struck by another large celestial body
 it was destroyed by a hypothetical brown dwarf, the companion star to the Sun, known as Nemesis
 it was shattered by some internal catastrophe

In 1953, Soviet Russian astronomer Ivan I. Putilin suggested that Phaeton was destroyed due to centrifugal forces, giving it a diameter of approximately 6,880 kilometers (slightly larger than Mars' diameter of 6,779 km) and a rotational speed of 2.6 hours. Eventually, the planet became so distorted that parts of it near its equator were spun off into space. Outgassing of gases once stored in Phaeton's interior caused multiple explosions, sending material into space and forming asteroid families. However, his theory was not widely accepted. Two years later in 1955, Odesan astronomer Konstantin N. Savchenko suggested that Ceres, Pallas, Juno, and Vesta were not fragments of Phaeton, but rather its former moons. Phaeton had an additional fifth satellite, assumed to be the size of Ceres, orbiting near the planet's Hill sphere, and thus more subject to gravitational perturbations from Jupiter. As a result, the fifth satellite became tidally detached and orbited the Sun for millions of years afterward, making periodic close misses with Phaeton that slowly increased its velocity. Once the escaped satellite re-entered Phaeton's Hill sphere, it collided with the planet at high speed, shattering it while Ceres, Pallas, Juno, and Vesta assumed heliocentric orbits. Simulations showed that for such a Ceres-sized body to shatter Phaeton, it would need to be travelling at nearly 20 kilometers per second.

The disrupted planet hypothesis has also been supported by French–Italian mathematician and astronomer Joseph-Louis Lagrange in 1814; Canadian geologist Reginald Daly in 1943; American geochemists Harrison Brown and Clair Patterson in 1948;  Soviet academics Alexander Zavaritskiy in 1948, Vasily Fesenkov in 1950 (who later rejected his own model) and Otto Schmidt (died 1956); British–Canadian astronomer Michael Ovenden in 1972–1973; and American astronomer Donald Menzel in 1978. Ovenden suggested that the planet be named "Krypton" after the destroyed native world of Superman, as well as believing it to have been a gas giant roughly eighty-five to ninety Earth masses in mass and nearly the size of Saturn.

Today, the Phaeton hypothesis has been superseded by the accretion model. Most astronomers today believe that the asteroids in the main belt are remnants of the protoplanetary disk that never formed a planet, and that in this region the amalgamation of protoplanets into a planet was prevented by the disruptive gravitational perturbations of Jupiter during the formative period of the Solar System.

Other hypotheses 
Some scientists and non-scientists continue to advocate for the existence and destruction of a Phaeton-like planet.

Zecharia Sitchin suggested that the goddess known to the Sumerians as Tiamat in fact relates to a planet that was destroyed by a rogue planet known as Nibiru, creating both Earth and the asteroid belt. His work is widely regarded as pseudoscience.

The astronomer and author Tom Van Flandern held that Phaeton (which he called "Planet V", with V representing the Roman numeral for five and not to be confused with the other postulated former fifth planet not attributed to the formation of the asteroid belt) exploded through some internal mechanism. In his "Exploded Planet Hypothesis 2000", he lists possible reasons for its explosion: a runaway nuclear reaction of uranium in its core, a change of state as the planet cooled down creating a density phase change, or through continual absorption of heat in the core from gravitons. Van Flandern even suggested that Mars itself may have been a moon of Planet V, due to its craters hinting to exposure to meteorite storms and its relatively low density compared to the other inner planets.

In 1972, Soyuzmultfilm studios produced an animated short film titled Phaeton: The Son of Sun, directed by Vasiliy Livanov, in which the asteroid belt is portrayed as the remains of a planet. The film also has numerous references to ancient astronauts.

Phaeton in literature

Several works of fiction feature a supposed planet (sometimes named Phaeton or Maldek) existing in the past between the orbits of Mars and Jupiter, which somehow became the Solar System's asteroid belt.

See also

 Asteroid belt
 Disrupted planet
 Fifth planet
 Giant-impact hypothesis
 History of Solar System formation and evolution hypotheses
 List of hypothetical Solar System objects
 Nibiru
 Planet V
 Theia (planet)
 Zecharia Sitchin

References

Sources
 
 

 
 , Records of meetings 1808–1916 in v. 11–27, p. 872.

External links
 J. Timothy Unruh, "Phaeton, The Lost Planet: An Ancient World that Perished," Planetary Papers, No. 6 – a condensed version of Unruh's book
 Kevin O'Flynn, " Asteroid Could End World Monday," Asteroid News, December 16, 2000

History of astronomy
Hypothetical impact events
Hypothetical bodies of the Solar System
Hypothetical planets
Ceres (dwarf planet)

it:Pianeti ipotetici#Fetonte